Shahbanu (Šahbānū lit. "Lady King") was the title for empress regnant or empress consort in Persian and other Iranian languages. The two Sassanian empresses regnant, Boran and Azarmidokht, c. 630, were the last two that carried the title before Farah Pahlavi, the wife of Mohammad Reza Pahlavi, the last Shah of Iran (Persia), assumed the title on being crowned queen in 1967 for the first time since the Muslim conquest of Persia in the 7th century.

As an empress during Sassanid times, the principal Shahbanu was also titled Banbishnan banbishn ("Queen of Queens") analogous to the emperor's title shahanshah (lit. "King of Kings") to distinguish her from the other queens in the royal household.

Farah Pahlavi sometimes continues to be referred to as Shahbanu, as is customarily done internationally for titleholders associated with abolished monarchies, but the title is no longer valid in Iran. According to the Persian Constitution of 1906, Yasmine Pahlavi, Crown Princess of Iran, would currently hold this title.

See also

 Shah
 List of queens of Persia

References

Iranian empresses
Imperial titles
Titles in Iran
Persian words and phrases